Justin Ryan Sellers  (born February 1, 1986) is an American former professional baseball infielder. He played in Major League Baseball (MLB) for the Los Angeles Dodgers and Cleveland Indians. Primarily a shortstop, Sellers also played second base and third base.

Professional career

Oakland Athletics
Sellers was drafted by the Oakland Athletics in the 6th round of the 2005 MLB Draft out of high school. He played with the Vancouver Canadians in 2005 and the Kane County Cougars in 2006. He then split 2007 between the Stockton Ports and Midland RockHounds. In the Hawaii Winter Baseball League, he was voted the 2007 Defensive Player of the Year.  In 2008 at Midland, he hit .255 in 123 games. He was traded to the Chicago Cubs on February 2, 2009, along with Richie Robnett, for Michael Wuertz.

Los Angeles Dodgers
The Cubs traded him to the Los Angeles Dodgers on April 2, 2009, for future considerations.

In 2009, he was selected to the Southern League all-star team, while hitting .280 with the Double-A Chattanooga Lookouts.  He spent most of 2010 with the Triple-A Albuquerque Isotopes, hitting .285 in 90 games. In 2011, with the Isotopes, he was in 89 games and hit .304 with 14 home runs.

On August 12, 2011, he was called up to the Dodgers, replacing the injured Dee Gordon on the active roster. He was hitless in three at-bats as the starting shortstop against the Houston Astros in his debut that night.  He collected his first hit the following day against Wandy Rodríguez and his first home run on the 14th against Jordan Lyles. He appeared in 36 games for the Dodgers, split between second base and shortstop, and hit .203.

Sellers began 2012 as a utility infielder for the Dodgers, appearing in 19 games and hitting .205. However, he experienced numbness in his right leg on May 24. He said that he thought the injury had originally occurred when he crashed into the stands to make a catch against the Arizona Diamondbacks the week before. He was placed on the disabled list the following day. After a lengthy period, he played some rehab games with Class-A Rancho Cucamonga in early August but it was shut down after a few games due to lower back pain. It was determined that Sellers would need surgery on his lower back and that he would not be able to play again during the 2012 season.

On January 19, 2013, Sellers was arrested in West Sacramento after police found him driving recklessly on his motorcycle. After a short chase, he turned himself in.

Sellers became the Dodgers opening day starter at shortstop in 2013 after Hanley Ramírez was injured during the 2013 World Baseball Classic. He hit only .188 in 27 games and was optioned back to AAA. In 89 games with the Isotopes, he hit .270.

Sellers was designated for assignment by the Dodgers on February 22, 2014, and removed from the 40-man roster.

Cleveland Indians
Sellers was traded to the Cleveland Indians in exchange for cash considerations on March 2, 2014.

Pittsburgh Pirates
On October 25, 2014, he was traded to the Pittsburgh Pirates for cash considerations.

Chicago White Sox
On July 30, 2015, Sellers was traded to the Chicago White Sox for a player to be named or cash considerations.

San Diego Padres
On March 7, 2016, Sellers signed a minor league deal with the San Diego Padres. He was released on March 28.

Personal
Sellers is the son of former Boston Red Sox pitcher Jeff Sellers.

See also

List of second-generation Major League Baseball players

References

External links

1986 births
Living people
Albuquerque Isotopes players
American expatriate baseball players in Canada
Baseball players from California
Bradenton Marauders players
Charlotte Knights players
Chattanooga Lookouts players
Cleveland Indians players
Columbus Clippers players
Gigantes de Carolina players
Gulf Coast Pirates players
Indianapolis Indians players
Inland Empire 66ers of San Bernardino players
Kane County Cougars players
Los Angeles Dodgers players
Major League Baseball shortstops
Midland RockHounds players
People from Bellflower, California
Peoria Javelinas players
Rancho Cucamonga Quakes players
Stockton Ports players
Tigres del Licey players
American expatriate baseball players in the Dominican Republic
Tomateros de Culiacán players
Vancouver Canadians players
Waikiki Beach Boys players
Yaquis de Obregón players
American expatriate baseball players in Mexico